Zamudio Sociedad Deportiva is a Spanish football team based in Zamudio, in the autonomous community of Basque Country. Founded in 1943, it plays in Tercera División – Group 4, holding home games at Estadio Gazituaga, with a capacity of 5,000 seats.

Season to season

2 season in Segunda División B
20 seasons in Tercera División

Current squad

Honours
Tercera División: 2015–16

References
Official website 
Futbolme team profile 

Football clubs in the Basque Country (autonomous community)
Association football clubs established in 1943
1943 establishments in Spain